Psychrobacter ciconiae is a Gram-negative, rod-shaped bacterium of the genus Psychrobacter, which was isolated from the stork Ciconia ciconia.

References

Further reading

External links
Type strain of Psychrobacter ciconiae at BacDive -  the Bacterial Diversity Metadatabase	

Moraxellaceae
Bacteria described in 2015